Vlierzele is a village on the Molenbeek, in the Denderstreek, at the edge of the Flemish Ardennes, the hilly southern part of East Flanders, Belgium. It belongs to the municipality of Sint-Lievens-Houtem.

Etymologically the name Vlierzele is derived from Fliteritsale (in 639) and Vliendersele (in 1412). This is a combination of either the plant name "vlier", which is Dutch for "elder", or the person's name Flether, and "sale" or "sele", which both mean place of residence in Old-Dutch.

The neighbouring villages are:

Bambrugge
Bavegem
Borsbeke
Burst
Erondegem
Letterhoutem
Ottergem
Oordegem
Papegem
Vlekkem
Zonnegem

Gallery

References

External links 
 Webpage at Reocities

Sint-Lievens-Houtem
Populated places in East Flanders